Don't Play Me Cheap is a studio album by Ike & Tina Turner released on Sue Records in 1963.

Content and release 
Don't Play Me Cheap was arranged by Jesse Herring and René Hall. It features mainly compositions by Ike Turner with the exception of "The Real Me" which was written by Curtis Mayfield and "Love Letters" written by Edward Heyman and Victor Young. The album was released in February 1963 and produced one single, "Wake Up," released in April 1963 with the title track as the B-side. The song "I Made A Promise Up Above" was the B-side to the single "Dear John" in 1966.

Critical reception 
Cash Box (February 23, 1963): Ike and Tina are one of the best-blended teams around today. Tina's exacting sense of rhythm on both pulsating r&b numbers and ballads is perfectly complemented by Ike's first-rate piano and guitar work. The duo are in fine form on this Sue entry of danceable blues sides. The songstress belts out winning readings of "Wake Up," "Don't Play Me Cheap" and "My Everything To Me" with all of her expected poise and artistry.

Reissues 
Don't Play Me Cheap was reissued on CD by Collectables Records in 1997. It was reissued in its original LP format by Rumble Records in 2015.

Track listing 
All songs written by Ike Turner, except where indicated.

References 

Ike & Tina Turner albums
1963 albums
Albums arranged by René Hall
Sue Records albums
Blues albums by American artists
Rhythm and blues albums by American artists